Homochlodes is a genus of moths in the family Geometridae described by George Duryea Hulst in 1896.

Species
 Homochlodes disconventa (Walker, 1860)
 Homochlodes fritillaria (Guenée, 1857)
 Homochlodes lactispargaria (Walker, 1861)

References

Geometridae